George Harley may refer to:
 George Harley (physician) (1829–1896), Scottish physician
 George Davies Harley (1762–1811), English actor and poet
 George Harley (painter) (1791–1871), English watercolourist
 George Way Harley (1894–1966), American Methodist missionary in Liberia